The 1965 Wisconsin Badgers football team represented the University of Wisconsin in the 1965 Big Ten Conference football season.

Schedule

Team players in the 1966 NFL Draft

References

Wisconsin
Wisconsin Badgers football seasons
Wisconsin Badgers football